The 2006–07 Detroit Red Wings season was the 81st National Hockey League season in Detroit, Michigan. The Wings entered a new era, following the retirement of longtime captain Steve Yzerman after 22 seasons (23 years) in the NHL, all spent with Detroit.  The Wings named Yzerman a team vice-president, Yzerman's number 19 was retired by the Wings in January.

The Red Wings lost another longtime player in Brendan Shanahan, who signed with the New York Rangers, although they retained the services of goaltender Dominik Hasek, who re-signed with the club as a free agent. Hasek remained one of the NHL's goaltending leaders, helping the Red Wings remain in contention for top spot in the Western Conference, battling with their division rivals, the Nashville Predators.

Two Red Wings players represented the West at the 2007 All-Star Game in Dallas, Texas – Nicklas Lidstrom was elected as a starting defenceman, and registered an assist, where he was joined by forward Henrik Zetterberg.

Regular season
On February 8, 2007, the Red Wings lost 1–0 at St. Louis. It was the first time that the Red Wings had been shut-out in a regular season game since January 7, 2004, when they lost at home 3–0 to the Boston Bruins. Prior to their loss to the Blues, the Red Wings had gone 175 consecutive regular season games without being shut-out.

Season standings

For complete final standings, see 2006–07 NHL season

Schedule and results

October

Record: 6–4–1; Home: 2–1–1; Road: 4–3–0

November

Record: 7–2–3; Home: 5–0–2; Road: 2–2–1

December

Record: 11–3–1; Home: 6–2–0; Road: 5–1–1

January

February

March

April

Green background indicates win.
Red background indicates regulation loss.
White background indicates overtime/shootout loss.

Playoffs

The Detroit Red Wings ended the 2006–07 regular season as the Western Conference's first seed.

Western Conference Quarter-finals: vs. (8) Calgary Flames
Detroit wins series 4–2

Western Conference Semi-finals: vs. (5) San Jose Sharks
Detroit wins series 4–2

Western Conference Finals: vs. (2) Anaheim Ducks
Anaheim wins series 4–2

Green background indicates win.     
Red background indicates loss.

Player stats

Awards and records

Records

Milestones

Transactions
The Red Wings have been involved in the following transactions during the 2006–07 season.

Trades

Free agents acquired

Free agents lost

Lost on waivers

Draft picks
Detroit's picks at the 2006 NHL Entry Draft in Vancouver, British Columbia.  The Red Wings had no first-round pick in this draft, having dealt the 29th overall pick to the Phoenix Coyotes.

Farm teams

Grand Rapids Griffins
The Griffins are Detroit's top affiliate in the American Hockey League in 2006–07.

Toledo Storm
The Storm are the Red Wings' ECHL affiliate for the 2006–07 season.

See also
2006–07 NHL season

References

Player stats: Detroit Red Wings player stats on espn.com
Game log: Detroit Red Wings game log on espn.com
Team standings: NHL standings on espn.com

Detroit Red Wings seasons
Detroit
Detroit
2007 in sports in Michigan
2006 in sports in Michigan